August Hermann Zeiz (23 September 1893 – 30 August 1964) was a German writer who worked under the pseudonyms Jean Barlatier and Georg Fraser. His work was part of the literature event in the art competition at the 1932 Summer Olympics.

References

1893 births
1964 deaths
20th-century German male writers
Olympic competitors in art competitions
Writers from Cologne